Follow You may refer to:

 "Follow You" (Deniz Koyu song), 2012
 "Follow You" (Bring Me the Horizon song), 2015
 "Follow You" (Imagine Dragons song), 2021
 "Follow You", by Echosmith from the album Lonely Generation